Jetut (also Romanized as Jetūţ and Jatūţ; also known as Jāteyāl, Jatīāl, Jatyāl, Jetal, and Jonūţ) is a village in Zirrah Rural District, Sadabad District, Dashtestan County, Bushehr Province, Iran. At the 2006 census, its population was 1,063, in 231 families.

References 

Populated places in Dashtestan County